The 2014–15 Atlantic Coast Conference men's basketball season began with practices in October 2014, followed by the start of the 2014–15 NCAA Division I men's basketball season in November. Conference play started in early January 2015 and concluded in March with the 2015 ACC men's basketball tournament at the Greensboro Coliseum in Greensboro, North Carolina. The 2014–15 season marked the first season in conference history without Maryland as a member; they departed the ACC for the Big Ten Conference in July 2014 and the first season for Louisville.

Preseason

Rankings

Regular season

Conference matrix
This table summarizes the head-to-head results between teams in conference play. (x) indicates games remaining this season.

Postseason

ACC tournament

  March 10–14, 2015 Atlantic Coast Conference Basketball Tournament, Greensboro Coliseum, Greensboro.

NCAA tournament

NBA Draft

Honors and awards

References